Mengbi is a small town in the north west Hunan province of China.

See also 
 List of township-level divisions of Hunan

References

Townships of Hunan
Longshan County